The 2004–05 Northern Football League season was the 107th in the history of Northern Football League, a football competition in England.

Division One

Division One featured 18 clubs which competed in the division last season, along with three new clubs, promoted from Division Two:
 Ashington
 Consett
 Newcastle Benfield Saints

League table

Division Two

Division Two featured 15 clubs which competed in the division last season, along with five new clubs.
 Clubs relegated from Division One:
 Marske United
 Penrith
 Washington
 Plus:
 North Shields, joined from the Wearside Football League
 West Allotment Celtic, joined from the Northern Football Alliance

League table

References

External links
 Northern Football League official site

Northern Football League seasons
9